Tanja Krienke (born 13 December 1972) is a former competitive figure skater for East Germany. She is the 1990 World Junior bronze medalist, 1989 Karl Schäfer Memorial silver medalist, and 1990 East German national champion. She was 6th at the 1990 European Championships.

Competitive highlights

References 

1972 births
German female single skaters
Living people
Figure skaters from Berlin
20th-century German women
21st-century German women